Al qarah may refer to:

Al qarah, Hadhramaut, Yemen
Al qarah, San‘a’, Yemen